Herzegovina Province, Ottoman Empire may refer to:

 Sanjak of Herzegovina (1462-1833; 1851-1878)
 Eyalet of Herzegovina (1833-1851)